Luis Alberto Ferrizo (born 1951) was a member of the Congress of Uruguay starting in 1989.  Prior to that he had been a member of the Flores Department Council starting in 1971.

Ferrizo is a member of the Church of Jesus Christ of Latter-day Saints (LDS Church). He was baptized a member of the LDS Church in 1963. He served as the first president of the church's Durazno Uruguay Stake starting in 1980 and later served as a Regional Representative of the Twelve.

Sources
listing of Ferrizo's office
Deseret Morning News Church Almanac, 2008 edition, p. 497
Nestor Curbelo, "Luis Alberto Ferrizo", Tambuli, September 1991, p. 46.

1951 births
Living people
Intendants of Flores Department
Members of the Chamber of Representatives of Uruguay
Converts to Mormonism
Regional representatives of the Twelve
Uruguayan leaders of the Church of Jesus Christ of Latter-day Saints